Trevor Hall may refer to:

 Trevor Hall (musician), American singer, lyricist and guitarist
 Trevor Hall (album), an album by Trevor Hall
 Trevor Hall (rugby league), New Zealand landlord, salesman, and professional rugby league footballer
 Trevor H. Hall (1910-1991), British author, surveyor and skeptic of paranormal phenomena
 Trevor Hall, Denbighshire, country house

Hall, Trevor